One Touch of Nature is a 1909 American silent short drama film directed by D. W. Griffith. It is not known whether the film currently survives, which suggests that it is a lost film.

Cast
 Arthur V. Johnson as John Murray
 Florence Lawrence as Mrs. John Murray
 Marion Leonard as Sicilian Woman
 Charles Inslee as Sicilian Woman's Accomplice
 Harry Solter as Doctor
 Linda Arvidson as Nurse
 Kate Bruce
 Adele DeGarde
 Gladys Egan
 George Gebhardt as Man at Stage Door
 Jeanie MacPherson
 Gertrude Robinson
 Mack Sennett
 Dorothy West

References

External links
 

1909 films
1909 drama films
1909 short films
Silent American drama films
American silent short films
American black-and-white films
Films directed by D. W. Griffith
Films with screenplays by Stanner E.V. Taylor
1900s American films